Richard Bernstein (born May 5, 1944) is an American journalist, columnist, and author. He wrote the Letter from America column for the International Herald Tribune.  He has been a book critic at The New York Times and a foreign correspondent for both Time magazine and The New York Times in Europe and Asia.

Early life and education
Richard Bernstein was born  in New York City but grew up on a poultry farm in East Haddam, Connecticut. After graduating from Nathan Hale-Ray High School, he earned a B.A. in history from the University of Connecticut and an M.A. in History and East Asian Languages from Harvard University. In 1971, he moved to Taiwan to study Chinese.

Career
In 1973, Bernstein joined the staff of Time magazine tasked with writing about Asia. In 1979, he opened the magazine's first bureau in the People's Republic of China and served as the first Beijing bureau chief.  In 1982, he accepted a position with The New York Times where he served as the United Nations Bureau Chief, Paris Bureau Chief, National Cultural Correspondent, book critic, and Berlin Bureau Chief.

Published works
 
Bernstein's first book, From the Center of the Earth: The Search for the Truth About China (1982), was named one of the "Notable Books of the Year 1982" by The New York Times and solidified his reputation as a China expert. The Coming Conflict with China (1997) was chosen as one of The New York Times "Notable Books of the Year 1997."

 Bibliography 
From the Center of the Earth: The Search for the Truth About China (1982)
Fragile Glory: A Portrait of France and the French (1990)
Dictatorship of Virtue: Multiculturalism and the Battle for America's Future (1994)
The Coming Conflict with China (1997), with Ross. H. Munro
Ultimate Journey: Retracing the Path of an Ancient Buddhist Monk Who Crossed Asia in Search of Enlightenment (2001)
Out of the Blue: The Story of September 11, 2001, from Jihad to Ground Zero (2002)
The East, the West, and Sex: A History of Erotic Encounters (2009)
A Girl Named Faithful Plum: The Story of a Dancer from China and How She Achieved Her Dream (2012)
China 1945 (2014)

Personal life
Bernstein lives in the Park Slope neighborhood of Brooklyn, New York City. His wife is Zhongmei Li, a Chinese classical dancer who worked with Jia Zhoungli and whom he met at a New York film screening. She attended the Beijing Dance Academy for 7 years (1978-1984) and founded the New York-based Zhongmei Dance Company in 1992.

References

External links 
Biography at Random House
Profile at New York Review of Books
Articles at The New York Times
Articles at Time
Interview with Bold Type Magazine
Interview with Charlie Rose

1944 births
Living people
Harvard Graduate School of Arts and Sciences alumni
International Herald Tribune people
American newspaper reporters and correspondents
American columnists
Jewish American journalists
The New York Times writers
Journalists from New York City
People from East Haddam, Connecticut
Journalists from Connecticut
University of Connecticut alumni
20th-century American journalists
American male journalists
20th-century American male writers
21st-century American journalists
21st-century American male writers
21st-century American Jews
American expatriates in Taiwan